Edward George Britton Moss (1856 – 9 March 1916) was an Independent Liberal Member of Parliament for  in New Zealand.

Biography

Edward Moss was born in 1856 at Longwood House, on the island of Saint Helena in the South Atlantic Ocean. He arrived in New Zealand in 1859 on the Zealandia and was educated at the Otago Boys' High School and Church of England Grammar School in Parnell, Auckland. Moss was a lawyer at Paeroa.

Moss was an Independent Liberal who bitterly opposed Premier Richard Seddon.

Edward Moss was also a Māori scholar and natural historian. He was a conchologist and lived his later part of his life at Claybrook, a house that is today registered by Heritage New Zealand as a Category II heritage building. He died on 9 March 1916 at his home in Parnell, Auckland.

Works
 Beautiful shells of New Zealand : an illustrated work for amateur collectors of New Zealand marine shells, with directions for collecting and cleaning them. Collins Bros., 1908.

Notes

References

 The New Liberal Party 1905 by G.F. Whitcher (1966, MA(Hons) Thesis-University of Canterbury, Christchurch)

External links

1856 births
1916 deaths
Independent MPs of New Zealand
New Zealand Liberal Party MPs
19th-century New Zealand lawyers
New Zealand writers
New Zealand people of English descent
People from Paeroa
Saint Helenian emigrants to New Zealand
People educated at Otago Boys' High School
Unsuccessful candidates in the 1899 New Zealand general election
Unsuccessful candidates in the 1905 New Zealand general election
Unsuccessful candidates in the 1908 New Zealand general election
Members of the New Zealand House of Representatives
New Zealand MPs for North Island electorates
19th-century New Zealand politicians
Conchologists